Ganns (formerly, Ganns Meadows) is an unincorporated community in Calaveras County, California. It lies at an elevation of 6742 feet (2055 m).

References

External links

Unincorporated communities in California
Unincorporated communities in Calaveras County, California